Notable persons with the surname Davidge include:
 Cecil Davidge (1901–1981), British barrister and academic
 Christopher Davidge (born 1929), British rower
 Cecil William Davidge (1863-1936), British academic, author and freemason
 George Davidge (fl. 1924), English rugby union and rugby league footballer
 Glyn Davidge (1933–2006), Welsh rugby union player
 Graham Davidge (fl. 1975–present), Australian musician
 Guy Davidge (1878–1956), English cricketer
 Neil Davidge (born 1962), British record producer and songwriter
 William Pleater Davidge (1814–1888), English comedian
 William Robert Davidge (1879–1961), architect and surveyor